is a Japanese manga series written and illustrated by Daisuke Terasawa about a teen boy Shota Sekiguchi (関口将太 Sekiguchi Shōta) and his journey from an apprentice to become a sushi chef. It was later adapted into TV series, produced by Fuji TV. The manga series ended when Shota won the regional sushi competition in Tokyo. A sequel continued with him being the Tokyo representative in the national competition, to keep a promise for a re-match with his rival Saji Yasuto.

Plot
Shota Sekiguchi's family operated a small sushi shop (巴寿司) in the small city of Otaru, Hokkaido. The business was badly affected by the encroachment of Sasa Zushi (笹寿司), a sushi-chain conglomerate which sought to dominate the market by offering cheaper mass-produced sushi, glitzier facades and suppressing prices of ingredients through bulk purchases.  To make matters worse, Shota's mother suffered from incurable illness which drained the family of their savings and disrupted his father's earnings.

In an attempt to save the family business, Shota took over his father's, Genji Sekiguchi's, place in a local sushi competition after his father was injured.  Despite not winning, Shota impressed one of the judges, Seigoro Otori. Seigoro Otori was owner of O Sushi (鳳寿司), a famous establishment in Tokyo.  He offered to take on Shota as an apprentice. Genji agreed, realising that Shota would need the greater exposure in Tokyo in order to develop himself to face the challenge of reviving the family business.

In Tokyo, Shota faced numerous obstacles and realised being a successful sushi master was a lot more than just knowing how to prepare tasty sushi.  The two most senior disciples in O Sushi, Masaji Fujita (藤田政二 Fujita Masaji) and Hidemasa Okamura (岡村秀政 Okamura Hidemasa) were friendly and helpful, but the third disciple, Yasuto Saji (佐治安人 Saji Yasuto), frequently bullied the newcomer Shota and the other young apprentice Shingo Obata (小畑慎吾 Obata Shingo).

Seigoro Otori quietly assessed the situation and decided the best way for Shota to master the trade quickly was to allow the rivalry between Shota and Yasuto to develop for the two spur each other.  He announced a three-round contest between them to select the representative of O Sushi in the forthcoming Tokyo sushi competition.

In the first round, the subject sea bream was deliberately chosen as it was out of season.   Both contenders had to source for the fish themselves.  Shota's friends managed to find one for him but it was stolen by Yasuto to use in the contest.  Despite using an inferior sub-species of the sea bream, Shota won by employing a superior cooking technique.  The loss was a blow to Yasuto.  It also shook him up and reassess his own approach towards life.

The subject was the second round was unagi.  The contest favoured Yasuto who revealed he had been brewing his own eel sauce for the past three years - the gravy was a crucial component of preparing the dish.  All Japanese chefs serving eels are expected to brew their own sauce, which is maintained continuously through adding new stock. The newcomer Shota was disadvantaged as it would take years to brew a decent sauce.  Shota came up with an innovative method of preparing the dish without the use of traditional sauce.  Though it was delicious, he lost the round as he failed a critical question posed by Otori Seigoro on the order of serving the dishes.

The third round allowed the contestants to select their own ingredients.  To encourage a disheartened Shingo Obata who was belittled by Yasuto for losing to a newcomer, Shota opted to use anchovy, a usually unappreciated fish to which Yasuto likened Shingo to.  Shota made Shingo promise to stay if he won, which he did.

Despite losing the contest, Yasuto matured tremendously in the process and won the recognition from Seigoro Otori who wanted to promote Yasuto to man a counter at the restaurant.  Yasuto declined and decided to further his training elsewhere, explaining that he feared his growth would be limited if he remained at O Sushi with Shota.  Nevertheless, he swore to Shota he would seek a re-match someday.

The story moved to Shota's participation in the Tokyo sushi competition where he continued to learn new things with every round of the tournament.  In between, he also had to visit Otaru where Sasa Zushi continued in their attempt to drive his father out of business.

Media

Manga

Drama

Reception

References

External links
 

1992 manga
Cooking in anime and manga
Kodansha manga
TV Tokyo original programming
Seinen manga
Shōnen manga